Live: The 1971 Tour is a live album from Grand Funk Railroad which was recorded over several performances in 1971 but not released until 2002.

Track listing
All selections composed by Mark Farner, except where otherwise noted.

Intro (Also sprach Zarathustra) - 1:39: Date/venue not listed.
"Are You Ready" - 3:11: Recorded at The Syndrome, Wabash Avenue, Chicago, Illinois on May 1, 1971.
"Footstompin' Music" - 5:24: Recorded at The Cobo Arena, Jefferson Ave, Detroit, Michigan on April 29, 1971.
"Paranoid" - 6:03: Recorded at The Cobo Arena, Jefferson Ave, Detroit, Michigan on April 29, 1971.
"I'm Your Captain/Closer to Home" - 5:48: Recorded at Shea Stadium, Roosevelt Avenue, Flushing, New York on July 9, 1971.
"Hooked on Love" - 2:45: Recorded at Shea Stadium, Roosevelt Avenue, Flushing, New York on July 9, 1971.
"Get it Together - 2:46: Recorded at Shea Stadium, Roosevelt Avenue, Flushing, New York on July 9, 1971.
"T.N.U.C" - 17:12: Recorded at The Cobo Arena, Jefferson Ave, Detroit, Michigan on April 29, 1971.
"Inside-Looking Out" (John Lomax, Alan Lomax, Eric Burdon, Bryan "Chas" Chandler) - 15:30: Recorded at The Cobo Arena, Jefferson Ave, Detroit, Michigan on April 29, 1971.
"Gimme Shelter" (Mick Jagger, Keith Richards) - 8:44: Recorded at Shea Stadium, Roosevelt Avenue, Flushing, New York on July 9, 1971.
"Into the Sun" - 9:50: Recorded at The Cobo Arena, Jefferson Ave, Detroit, Michigan on the April 30, 1971.

References

External links 
 Source for the dates: 
 Source for the venues: 

Live: The 1971 Tour
Grand Funk Railroad live albums